Bazaar is an unincorporated community in Chase County, Kansas, United States.  It is located about halfway between Strong City and Matfield Green near the intersection of K-177 highway and Sharps Creek Rd.

History

A post office was established in Bazaar on April 16, 1860.  The post office was renamed "Mary" on July 20, 1876, and then back to Bazaar on March 19, 1878.  The post office closed on April 26, 1974.

On March 31, 1931, a Transcontinental & Western Air airliner crashed a few miles southwest of Bazaar, killing all on board, including  University of Notre Dame coach Knute Rockne.

Bazaar still serves as a rail depot for local cattle ranching.

Additionally several large ranches are owned by Texas oil billionaire Ed Bass and The Nature Conservancy, most of which is the Flint Hills section that overlaps the city and remains primarily for conservation purposes of the Flint Hills.

Geography
Bazaar is located in the Flint Hills region of the Great Plains.

Demographics
The community is part of the Emporia Micropolitan Statistical Area.

Education
The community is served by Chase County USD 284 public school district.  It has two schools.

Transportation 
K-177 highway and Southern Transcon main line of BNSF Railway both pass north–south through Bazaar.

References

Further reading

External links

 Bazaar - A "Quiet" town of Chase County, Kansas
 Bazaar United Methodist Church history
 Chase County maps: Current, Historic, KDOT

Unincorporated communities in Chase County, Kansas
Unincorporated communities in Kansas
Emporia, Kansas micropolitan area